Amjad Ali Aazmi (Urdu: مفتى أمجد على أعظمى) (November 1882 – 6 September 1948), also known with honorifics by followers as Sadr al-Shariah (Urdu: صدر الشريعه, Chief of the Islamic Law) Badr-e-Tariqat (Shining Moon of the Spiritual Mythology or Tariqah) was an Islamic jurist, writer and former Grand Mufti of India. Amjad Ali was born in 1882 (1300 Hijri), in the Mohalla Karimuddin Pur, Ghosi, Mau district, Uttar Pradesh, India. His father's name was Hakim Jamaluddin Ansari. His father and grandfather were scholars in religious theology and in Unani medicine.

Death
Amjad Ali Aazmi died on 6 September 1948 in Bombay, and was buried at Ghosi in Uttar Pradesh, India.

Books
 Bahar-e-Shariat
 Fatawa Amjadia
 Islami Akhlaq-O-Adaab
 Ada e Haj O Umrah

See also
 Grand Mufti of India
 List of Hanafis
 List of Sufis
 List of Sufi saints

References

External links 
 Biography at Sunnirazvi.net

1882 births
1948 deaths
People from Mau district
20th-century Indian judges
Indian Sufis
Grand Muftis
Grand Muftis of India
Indian imams
Islam in India
Barelvis
Sunni Sufis
Sunni imams
Hanafis